Kywenan is a village in Kalewa Township, Kale District, in the Sagaing Region of western Burma. It lies on the bank of the Chindwin River.

References

External links
 Maplandia World Gazetteer

Populated places in Kale District
Kalewa Township